Agios Dimitrianos is a village in the Paphos District of Cyprus, located 12 km west of Pano Panagia. Agios Dimitrianos has an elevation of 564 m. The village was named after the church of Agios Dimitrianos located in the area where the village was built. Nearby Communities : Polemi, Psathi. Built at an elevation of 550 meters among low hills and many vineyards, Agios Dimitrianos is a small settlement of approximately 70 inhabitants who live in traditional stone houses with wooden doors and balconies. Tourist accommodation includes rooms for rent and traditional guesthouses.

References

Communities in Paphos District